Petr Ruman (born 2 November 1976) is a Czech former professional footballer who manages Greuther Fürth II.

Career
In the first competitive match for 1. FSV Mainz 05 in the 2005–06 season, Ruman scored the first goal of the UEFA Cup qualification match first leg against Mika Ashtarak, the final score being 4–0. This goal made him the first player to score a goal for Mainz in an international competition.

He coached Türkgücü München from the 2021–22 season on but was sacked after just three months.

References

External links

1976 births
Living people
Sportspeople from Přerov
Czech footballers
Association football forwards
Czech Republic youth international footballers
Czech Republic under-21 international footballers
Czech First League players
Bundesliga players
2. Bundesliga players
3. Liga players
FC Baník Ostrava players
SpVgg Greuther Fürth players
1. FSV Mainz 05 players
VfR Aalen players
Czech football managers
3. Liga managers
Czech expatriate footballers
Czech expatriate football managers
Czech expatriate sportspeople in Germany
Expatriate footballers in Germany
Expatriate football managers in Germany